New Romney Priory, or the Priory of St John the Baptist was a 13th-century monastic grange in New Romney, Kent, England. Remains of the priory survive in the town.

History
Boniface, Archbishop of Canterbury,  granted in 1264 the advowson of the Church of St Nicholas in New Romney to Pontigny Abbey in France, making Romney a cell of the abbey. It is thought that the "priory"  was a monastic grange.

During the 14th and 15th centuries there were wars with France; the possessions of Pontigny Abbey were taken into the King's custody, and were finally confiscated about 1414. In 1439 Henry VI granted the priory to All Souls College, Oxford.

Description
St John's Priory House, an 18th-century building on the corner of High Street and Ashford Road, together with an small two-storey medieval building  on Ashford Road next to the house, and an adjoining wall along the road, are Grade II* listed. Remains of the priory west of the wall are a scheduled monument.

The small medieval building, of which the original purpose in not known, is of stone rubble. It has two pointed doorways, one of which is bricked up; there are three windows each with two lights, with a corbel-head in the spandrel between the lights. The adjacent wall is thought to be reconstructed from medieval stones; it has various windows and a bricked-up archway. The remains of the priory in the large garden west of the wall include a wall and archway, of brick and medieval stone; further remains are preserved below ground.

References

Scheduled monuments in Kent
Grade II* listed buildings in Kent
Monasteries in Kent